Thomas Gassilloud (born 21 May 1981) is a French politician of Agir, formerly of La République En Marche! , who has been serving as a member of the French National Assembly since 18 June 2017, representing the 10th constituency of the department of Rhône.

Early life and education
Gassiloud was born in Saint-Symphorien-sur-Coise and  studied at Lumière University Lyon 2 and Emlyon Business School

Political career
In parliament, Gassiloud serves on the Committee on Sustainable Development and Regional Planning and the Parliamentary Office for the Evaluation of Scientific and Technological Choices (OPECST). He has been chairing the Committee on Sustainable Development and Regional Planning since 2022. 
 
In addition to his committee assignments, Gassiloud is part of the French Parliamentary Friendship Groups with the Central African Republic, Chad and Mali.

See also
 2017 French legislative election
 2022 French legislative election

References

Living people
1981 births
Emlyon Business School alumni
Deputies of the 15th National Assembly of the French Fifth Republic
Agir (France) politicians
La République En Marche! politicians
21st-century French politicians

Deputies of the 16th National Assembly of the French Fifth Republic
Members of Parliament for Rhône